Canadian Industries Limited, also known as C-I-L, is a Canadian chemicals manufacturer. Products include paints, fertilizers and pesticides, and explosives. It was formed in 1910 by the merger of five Canadian explosives companies. It was until recently a subsidiary of Imperial Chemical Industries until ICI was purchased by AkzoNobel.

History

Hamilton Powder Company

The oldest direct ancestor of what would become CIL originally started in 1862, then known as the Hamilton Powder Company. They were created to buy the assets of the former Canada Powder Company, which had formed in 1852. Their major product was black powder, used for blasting. In 1878 the company was purchased by Dr. Thomas C. Brainerd, a U.S. businessman in the black powder industry. In order to provide the massive amounts of explosives needed to build the Canadian Pacific Railway, a new dynamite factory was opened in McMasterville, Quebec. Other black powder plants were acquired in Quebec and the Maritimes and, in 1890, the company opened the first explosives plant in the far west, near Nanaimo, British Columbia. Another major ancestor was the Dominion Cartridge Company, started at Brownsburg, Quebec (just west of Montreal) in 1886 by Captain A. L. ("Gat") Howard, who introduced the Gatling gun into Canada and operated a battery of two of the new weapons during the Riel Rebellion.

Canadian Explosives Company
In 1910 Hamilton Powder and Dominion Cartridge merged with the Acadia Powder Company, Ontario Powder Company, Standard Explosives Company, Western Explosives Company and Victoria Chemical Company to form the Canadian Explosives Company (CXL). This was a major supplier to the Canadian Expeditionary Force during World War I, which led to the building of a new factory in the newly christened Nobel, Ontario in 1914. CXL also operated another plant across the highway on behalf of British Cordite Limited. All of the Nobel plants closed after the war in 1922, when secondary markets were not forthcoming. Then all was lost in a huge fire in 1923.

Canadian Explosives Limited
During the 1920s they diversified into paint and varnish, coated fabrics and plastics and changed their name in 1927 to Canadian Explosives Ltd. (CEL). In 1928 they re-opened the Nobel plants and acquired the Dominion Cartridge Company. In 1929 CEL merged with the Canadian Salt Co. Ltd. (CSXX), Grasselli Chemical Co. Ltd. (Grasselli), and Mond Nickel Co. (MNX) and changed their name to Canadian Industries Ltd.

World War II
With the approach of World War II, the company formed a subsidiary in September 1939 called Defence Industries Limited. Cartridge plants were opened on Park Avenue in Brownsburg, Quebec with government funding and the technical assistance of the Dominion Cartridge Company. A cannon shell factory (and the entire nearby town itself) was built at Ajax, Ontario (nicknamed "Dilville"). They opened new plants on the site formerly used by British Cordite in Nobel. The Nobel site employed 4,300 people at its peak, and the company as a whole employed 33,000.

On 3 May 1944, a CIL sulfuric acid plant in Sudbury, Ontario was certified as unionized by Mine-Mill Local 598.

Because so many working-age men were fighting overseas in the armed forces, these plants employed large numbers of women.  At the Ajax DIL plant about 7,000 women filled more than 40 million shells.

Post war

A great post-war building program geared C-I-L to meet peacetime needs for explosives, paints, agricultural and industrial chemicals, plastics, sporting ammunition and man-made textile fabrics. The Nobel plants were once again closed, and this time sold off to Orenda Aerospace for use in jet engine development.

In 1913 the predecessor of CXL had established a dynamite plant on James Island, B.C. off the coast of Vancouver Island and near the town of Sidney, B.C.  The plant was later reacquired by CIL and produced explosives until its closure in 1972.

Re-organization
In 1954 C-I-L was divided into two separate companies in accordance with the ruling of a U.S. court which had ordered E. I. du Pont de Nemours (today's DuPont) to end its joint interests with Imperial Chemical Industries Limited (ICI). Until 2010, C-I-L operated as part of Imperial Chemical Industries. In 2010 ICI was bought by AkzoNobel, a Dutch chemical company. Then in 2014, AkzoNobel's North American architectural coatings division was acquired by PPG Industries and has operated as PPG Architectural Coatings Canada since. The CIL brand is sold in major Canadian retailers Home Depot, Canadian Tire, Walmart and Rona/Réno-Dépôt.

In 1976 Industries Valcartier Inc. bought out CIL's commercial cartridge production. This granted them the rights to CIL's popular Dominion, Imperial and Canuck commercial ammunition brands.

Another of their manufacturing facilities, the Millhaven Fibres plant, was formerly located in Millhaven, west of Kingston, Ontario.

The C-I-L lawn and garden chemical brand was owned by Sure-Gro Inc. of Brantford, Ontario, Canada. Their other brands included Nature Mix, Green Earth, Wilson and Alaskan Ice Melter. Sure-Gro was acquired by Premier Tech of Rivière-du-Loup, Québec, Canada in 2010 for about $13.5 million.

See also
CIL House
Science and technology in Canada
CIL Building
Departure Bay#History of the area

Archives
There is a Canadian Industries Limited fonds at Library and Archives Canada. Archival reference number is R15655.

References

Canadian Industries Limited
Nobel's Local History

External links
Company Website

Manufacturing companies of Canada
Paint manufacturers
Canadian subsidiaries of foreign companies
Canadian companies established in 1910
Manufacturing companies established in 1910